, born , is a professional Japanese football referee. He has been refereeing in the J-League since 2008 and has officiated a number of international club and country matches.

Career
Toma's first J-League game was in 2008, when he officiated the match between Omiya Ardija and Jubilo Iwata. Toma has also officiated in the Asian Champions League. In November 2011, Toma became the first foreign referee ever to be invited to officiate in a match in England's FA Cup when he was chosen to referee the First Round match between Brentford and Basingstoke Town.

International Matches officiated
Since officiating his first international match in 2009, Toma has officiated 4 matches. His most notable fixture to date has been a friendly between England and Mexico in 2010.

See also
 List of football referees

References

External links
 WorldReferee profile

Japanese football referees
Living people
1973 births
People from Hiroshima Prefecture